Buchanon is a surname. Notable people with the name include:

Phillip Buchanon (born 1980), American football player
Will Buchanon (born 1983), American football player
Willie Buchanon (born 1950), American football player

See also
 Buchanan (surname)
 Mitch Buchannon